The Hôtel du Cap-Eden-Roc is a resort hotel in Antibes on the French Riviera. Built in 1869 as a private mansion, it opened as a hotel in 1889.

History
The founder of France's Le Figaro newspaper, Hippolyte de Villemessant, built the Villa Soleil in 1869 for writers seeking inspiration. In 1887, Italian hotelier Antoine Sella bought the property, and opened the Grand Hôtel du Cap in 1889. In 1914, the Eden Roc pavillon was built 400 yards away from the main hotel. Gerald and Sara Murphy, a young American couple who had expatriated to France in the 1920s, once rented the hotel for an entire summer, a unique event for the era as the French Riviera was not a summer destination at the time, but a winter escape for the wealthy. With the Murphys came many writers and artists of the Lost Generation, including F. Scott Fitzgerald and Ernest Hemingway. Fitzgerald immortalized it as the Hôtel des Etrangers in Tender Is the Night. Marc Chagall made sketches in one of the shady beachside cabanas after their construction in the 1960s. The Kennedy family summered here in 1938 when John F. Kennedy was 21 years old. Guests included Marlene Dietrich, Orson Welles, the Duke and Duchess of Windsor, Winston Churchill and Charles De Gaulle. Elizabeth Taylor and Richard Burton conducted an affair and honeymooned there. The hotel has traditionally been a particular favourite of film stars, especially during the annual Cannes Film Festival.

Rudolf August Oetker, a German industrialist, and his wife Maja von Malaisé first spotted the mansion while sailing on the Côte d'Azur in 1964; they bought the hotel five years later.

Some scenes in the 1986 film,  Under the Cherry Moon,   starring and directed by Prince,  were filmed at the hotel.  In one of the more notable scenes, Prince and co-star Kristin Scott Thomas danced on the picturesque deck at the Eden Roc restaurant to Prince's musical ballad Alexa de Paris, as they bantered wittingly toward an impending courtship in the film.

For many years the hotel did not accept credit cards. Cash only was accepted, though most guests wired money ahead of their stay. In 2006 this policy was dropped.

For about twenty years, amfAR, a nonprofit devoted to AIDS research, has held a charity auction at the Hôtel du Cap-Eden-Roc as part of its annual Cinema Against AIDS event at the Cannes Film Festival. In May 2011, the Hôtel du Cap-Eden Roc was hosting, on its principal driveway to the sea, the Croisière 2011–2012 Collection of the Chanel couture house. It also was the scene for designer Karl Lagerfeld's short-film The Tale of a Fairy, featuring actors and models such as Anna Mouglalis, Kristen McMenamy or Baptiste Giabiconi.

Amenities
The property is composed of 3 buildings:
 The Hôtel du Cap
 The Eden-Roc
 Les 2 Fontaines
The main hotel, a Napoleon III château, is located on the southern tip of the Cap d'Antibes. It houses 117 suites. In addition, there are two private villas, the Villa Eleana (in front of the property) and the Villa Les Cèdres. Owner Maja Oetker decorates the rooms and suites.

The hotel has 3 restaurants, including the Michelin 1-star Louroc Restaurant and 6 bars.

Management
The Hôtel du Cap-Eden-Roc belongs to the Oetker Collection. The Oetker Collection is managed by the Oetker family.

References

External links

Hotel du Cap-Eden-Roc official site

Oetker Collection
Cap
Buildings and structures in Antibes
Dr. Oetker
Cap
1870 establishments in France